The 1909 Wellington City mayoral election was part of the New Zealand local elections held that same year. In 1909, elections were held for the Mayor of Wellington plus other local government positions including fifteen city councillors. The polling was conducted using the standard first-past-the-post electoral method.

Background
Thomas William Hislop, the incumbent Mayor, did not seek re-election. Alfred Newman was elected to office as the new Mayor of Wellington, beating four other contenders.

Mayoralty results

Councillor results

References

Mayoral elections in Wellington
1909 elections in New Zealand
Politics of the Wellington Region
1900s in Wellington